Dodder Park is a suburban linear park in Dublin, Ireland, consisting of over 100 hectares of fragmented parkland and remnant countryside.

Location
The park is located in Rathfarnham, Rathgar and Milltown. It is named after the River Dodder, which flows through it.

Attractions
There is angling on the River Dodder for members of the Dodder Angling Association. Anglers come to Ireland every year to fish the River Dodder. It is also a haven for wildlife: among the species to be seen are kingfisher, dipper, grey heron, sparrowhawk and fox.

Notes

External links
Dodder Park on the Dublin City Council website

Parks in Dublin (city)
Linear parks
Rathfarnham
Rathgar
Milltown, Dublin